Myriem Akheddiou (born 27 September 1978) is a Belgian stage and film actress. She studied at the Royal Conservatory of Brussels and began working in theatre after developing an interest in acting. She collaborated with directors Jean-Pierre and Luc Dardenne on a number of films, appearing in The Kid with a Bike (2011), Two Days, One Night (2014), The Unknown Girl (2016), and Young Ahmed (2019). 

Her film credits also include A Happy Event (2011), The Connection (2014), and The Benefit of the Doubt (2017), which earned her a Magritte Award nomination in the category of Most Promising Actress.

Selected filmography

References

External links

1978 births
Living people
Belgian film actresses
Belgian stage actresses
Belgian voice actresses
Actresses from Brussels
Magritte Award winners
21st-century Belgian actresses